Mount Hardisty is a  mountain summit located in the Athabasca River valley of Jasper National Park, in the Canadian Rockies of Alberta, Canada. Its nearest higher peak is Mount Kerkeslin,  to the south. Both mountains are part of the Maligne Range and are visible from the Icefields Parkway.


History

The mountain was named by James Hector in 1859 for Richard Hardisty (1831–1889), Chief factor at Rocky Mountain House, and later the first Metis Senator in Canada.

The mountain's name was officially adopted in 1912 by the Geographical Names Board of Canada.

Geology

Mount Hardisty is composed of sedimentary rock laid down during the Cambrian period and pushed east and over the top of younger rock during the Laramide orogeny.

Climate

Based on the Köppen climate classification, Mount Hardisty is located in a subarctic climate with cold, snowy winters, and mild summers. Temperatures can drop below -20 °C with wind chill factors below -30 °C. Precipitation runoff from Mount Hardisty drains into the Athabasca River.

See also
 Geography of Alberta

References

External links
 Weather forecast: Mount Hardisty
 Parks Canada web site: Jasper National Park

Gallery

Two-thousanders of Alberta
Canadian Rockies
Mountains of Jasper National Park
Alberta's Rockies